Nova Mob  is the second and final studio album by the American alternative rock band Nova Mob, a band formed by former Hüsker Dü drummer Grant Hart. It was released in 1994.

The two bonus tracks "Not Talkin' About" and "Evergreen Memorial Drive" are not listed on the album cover and do not appear on either the European version or the advance U.S. version of the CD. "Evergreen Memorial Drive" is a re-recording of a 1992 single.

"Old Empire" was released as a single, together with three tracks recorded for a VPRO radio session.

Track listing

Personnel
 Grant Hart –  vocals, guitar, production
 Tom Merkl – bass, vocals, production
 Chris Hesler – guitar, production
 Steve Sutherland  – drums, production
 John (J.C.) Clegg – baritone saxophone on “Shoot Your Way to Freedom”
 Dave Brattain – tenor saxophone on “Shoot Your Way to Freedom”
 Tom Secor – trombone on “Shoot Your Way to Freedom”
 Craig Jacquart – trumpet on “Shoot Your Way to Freedom”
 Kurt Christiansen – trumpet on “Shoot Your Way to Freedom”
 Chopper Black – production, engineering
 Brent Sigmeth  – engineering
 Pat Burkholder  – engineering

References

1994 albums
Grant Hart albums